Derrick LeRon Williams (born May 25, 1991) is an American professional basketball player for Panathinaikos of the Greek Basket League and the EuroLeague. He played college basketball for the Arizona Wildcats from 2009 to 2011.

Williams was selected with the second overall pick by the Minnesota Timberwolves in the 2011 NBA draft. He spent two-and-a-half seasons in Minnesota before being traded to the Sacramento Kings in November 2013. After two seasons with the Kings, Williams signed with the New York Knicks in July 2015. He later signed with the Miami Heat in July 2016 before being waived in February 2017. Williams joined the Cleveland Cavaliers the same month, with whom he reached the 2017 NBA Finals. He signed in China to start the 2017–18 season, but joined the Los Angeles Lakers on a 10-day contract in March 2018. Williams has played overseas since October 2018.

Early life
Williams was born in Bellflower, California, and graduated from La Mirada High School.

College career
Williams originally committed to play at the University of Southern California. He was quickly recruited by first-year head coach Sean Miller at the University of Arizona.

Freshman year
As a freshman in 2009-10, Williams averaged 15.7 points (7th in the Pac-10) and 7.1 rebounds per game, and had a field goal percentage of .575 (2nd in the Pac-10; 12th in the NCAA).  He was named a freshman All-American, All-Pac-10 first team and the Pac-10 Freshman of the Year.

Sophomore year

Williams rose to national prominence in his sophomore year. He averaged 19.5 points (2nd in the Pac-10) and 8.3 rebounds (4th) per game. During the 2011 season, Williams had a field goal percentage of .595 (tops in the Pac-10; 9th in the NCAA). He led the NCAA in True Shooting percentage (.690) and Effective Field Goal percentage (.650), helping lead the Arizona Wildcats basketball team to a regular season PAC-10 championship. Williams was named the Pac-10 Player of the Year.

Williams also contributed to the Wildcats' run in the 2011 NCAA Men's Division I Basketball Tournament. He made a critical block with less than 2 seconds against Memphis.  He had a 3-point play against the Texas Longhorns, which advanced the Wildcats to the Sweet 16 of the tournament. Williams then had a career-high 32 points along with 13 rebounds to lead Arizona in an upset victory over the #1-seeded Duke by a 16-point margin to advance into the Elite Eight, where they fell 65–63 to the future NCAA tournament champion, Connecticut. At the end of the season he was projected to be one of the top picks for the upcoming NBA draft.

Sophomore year honors:
 Pac-10 Player of the Year
 All-Pac-10 first team
 Three time Pac-10 Player of the Week
 USBWA District IX Player of the Year
 Wooden Award's 10-player All-America team in 2011
 First-team All-American by Sports Illustrated
 Second-team by the Associated Press in 2011.
 Second-team by Sporting News
 Second-team by the United States Basketball Writers Association
 Second-team by the National Association of Basketball Coaches
 Second-team by Fox Sports.

Professional career

Minnesota Timberwolves (2011–2013)
Williams announced that he would declare for the NBA draft on April 13, 2011. He was selected with the second overall pick by the Timberwolves in the 2011 NBA draft. During the NBA lockout of 2011, he spent the summer at the University of Arizona taking summer classes to finish his degree. Shortly after the draft, Under Armour signed an endorsement deal with Williams. Williams joined several other NBA players for an exhibition game in the Philippines during the summer of 2011.

Williams participated in the 2012 Rising Stars Challenge, as well as the 2012 NBA All-Star Weekend Slam Dunk Contest. Williams scored a season-high 27 points on February 28, 2012, in a win over the Los Angeles Clippers. He made 9 of 10 shots from the field and 4 of 4 from three-point range. He led the Timberwolves to victory over the New Orleans Hornets with what was then a career-high 28 points on March 17, 2013.

Sacramento Kings (2013–2015)

On November 26, 2013, Williams was traded to the Sacramento Kings for forward Luc Mbah a Moute. He made his debut on November 29, 2013, finishing with 12 points (on 6-for-13 shooting), six rebounds and four assists in a 104–96 overtime loss to the Los Angeles Clippers.  On December 9, 2013, Williams scored a career-high 31 points in a victory over the Dallas Mavericks.

In the Kings' 2014–15 season finale on April 15, Williams scored a season-high 22 points in a 122–109 win over the Los Angeles Lakers.

New York Knicks (2015–2016)
On July 9, 2015, Williams signed with the New York Knicks. He made his debut for the Knicks in the team's season opener against the Milwaukee Bucks on October 28, scoring a game-high 24 points in a 122–97 win. On January 12, 2016, he recorded his first double-double of the season with 15 points and 10 rebounds in a 120–114 win over the Boston Celtics. The next day, he tied his career-high of 31 points in a loss to the Brooklyn Nets.

Miami Heat (2016–2017)
On July 10, 2016, Williams signed with the Miami Heat. On February 6, 2017, he was waived by the Heat after appearing in 25 games.

Cleveland Cavaliers (2017)
On February 9, 2017, Williams signed a 10-day contract with the Cleveland Cavaliers. That night, Williams played 22 minutes in his debut in Cleveland's 118–109 loss to the Oklahoma City Thunder and scored 12 points, going 3-for-3 from the field and 6-for-8 from the free throw line. He went on to sign a second 10-day contract on February 22, and then a rest-of-season contract on March 4. The Cavaliers reached the 2017 NBA Finals, where they were beaten in five games by the Golden State Warriors.

Tianjin Gold Lions (2017–2018)
On December 28, 2017, Williams signed with the Tianjin Gold Lions of the Chinese Basketball Association. In 15 games for Tianjin between early January and early February, Williams averaged 20.0 points, 6.6 rebounds, 1.4 assists and 1.7 steals per game.

Los Angeles Lakers (2018)
On March 9, 2018, Williams signed a 10-day contract with the Los Angeles Lakers. After the contract expired, the Lakers decided to part ways with him.

Bayern Munich (2018–2019) 
On October 3, 2018, Williams signed with Bayern Munich of the Basketball Bundesliga (BBL) and the EuroLeague for the 2018–19 season. In the EuroLeague, Williams averaged 13.4 points (9th in the EuroLeague) and 4.2 rebounds over 29 games, and was 9th in the EuroLeague with a .794 free throw percentage. In the BBL, Williams won the championship with Bayern after defeating Alba Berlin in the BBL Finals.

Fenerbahçe (2019–2020) 
On July 18, 2019, Fenerbahçe announced that Williams had signed a one-year contract with the Turkish club.

Valencia (2020–2021) 
On July 8, 2020, Williams signed with Valencia Basket of the Spanish Liga ACB.

Maccabi Tel Aviv (2021–2022) 
On June 30, 2021, Williams signed a one-year contract with Maccabi Tel Aviv of the Israeli Basketball Premier League and the EuroLeague. He averaged 9.6 points, 3.2 rebounds and 1.2 assists per game. On June 28, 2022, Williams officially parted ways with the Israeli club.

Panathinaikos (2022–present) 
On July 15, 2022, Williams signed a one-year contract with Panathinaikos of the Greek Basket League and the EuroLeague.

Career statistics

NBA

Regular season

|-
| style="text-align:left;"| 
| style="text-align:left;"| Minnesota
| style="background:#cfecec;"| 66* || 15 || 21.5 || .412 || .268 || .697 || 4.7 || .6 || .5 || .5 || 8.8
|-
| style="text-align:left;"| 
| style="text-align:left;"| Minnesota
| 78 || 56 || 24.6 || .430 || .332 || .706 || 5.5 || .6 || .6 || .5 || 12.0
|-
| style="text-align:left;"| 
| style="text-align:left;"| Minnesota
| 11 || 0 || 14.7 || .352 || .133 || .875 || 2.4 || .1 || .4 || .4 || 4.9
|-
| style="text-align:left;"| 
| style="text-align:left;"| Sacramento
| 67 || 15 || 24.7 || .437 || .286 || .708 || 4.4 || .8 || .7 || .2 || 8.5
|-
| style="text-align:left;"| 
| style="text-align:left;"| Sacramento
| 74 || 6 || 19.8 || .447 || .314 || .684 || 2.7 || .7 || .5 || .1 || 8.3
|-
| style="text-align:left;"| 
| style="text-align:left;"| New York
| 80 || 9 || 17.9 || .450 || .293 || .758 || 3.7 || .9 || .4 || .1 || 9.3
|-
| style="text-align:left;"| 
| style="text-align:left;"| Miami
| 25 || 11 || 15.1 || .394 || .200 || .620 || 2.9 || .6 || .4 || .2 || 5.9
|-
| style="text-align:left;"| 
| style="text-align:left;"| Cleveland
| 25 || 0 || 17.1 || .505 || .404 || .692 || 2.3 || .6 || .2 || .1 || 6.2
|-
| style="text-align:left;"| 
| style="text-align:left;"| L.A. Lakers
| 2 || 0 || 4.5 || .250 || .000 || .000 || .5 || .0 || .0 || .0 || 1.0
|- class="sortbottom"
| style="text-align:center;" colspan=2| Career
| 428 || 112 || 20.7 || .434 || .300 || .710 || 4.0 || .7 || .5 || .3 || 8.9

Playoffs

|-
| style="text-align:left;"| 
| style="text-align:left;"| Cleveland
| 8 || 0 || 4.8 || .533 || .600 || 1.000 || .4 || .5 || .0 || .1 || 2.6
|- class="sortbottom"
| style="text-align:center;" colspan=2| Career
| 8 || 0 || 4.8 || .533 || .600 || 1.000 || .4 || .5 || .0 || .1 || 2.6

Euroleague

|-
| style="text-align:left;"| 2018–19
| style="text-align:left;"| Bayern Munich
| 29 || 2 || 26.0 || .460 || .333 || .784 || 4.2 || .6 || .6 || .5 || 13.4 || 14.2
|-
| style="text-align:left;"| 2019–20
| style="text-align:left;"| Fenerbahçe
| 28 || 20 || 26.1 || .487 || .373 || .667 || 3.9 || 1.2 || 1.1 || .3 || 11.3 || 12.5
|- class="sortbottom"
| style="text-align:left;"| Career
| style="text-align:left;"|
| 57 || 22 || 26.0 || .472 || .354 || .742 || 4.0 || .9 || .8 || .4 || 12.4 || 12.9

College

References

External links

 Arizona Wildcats bio
 EuroLeague profile
 

1991 births
Living people
African-American basketball players
All-American college men's basketball players
American expatriate basketball people in China
American expatriate basketball people in Israel
American expatriate basketball people in Germany
American expatriate basketball people in Greece
American expatriate basketball people in Spain
American expatriate basketball people in Turkey
American men's basketball players
Arizona Wildcats men's basketball players
Basketball players from California
Cleveland Cavaliers players
FC Bayern Munich basketball players
Fenerbahçe men's basketball players
Liga ACB players
Los Angeles Lakers players
Maccabi Tel Aviv B.C. players
Miami Heat players
Minnesota Timberwolves draft picks
Minnesota Timberwolves players
New York Knicks players
Panathinaikos B.C. players
People from La Mirada, California
Power forwards (basketball)
Sacramento Kings players
Sportspeople from Los Angeles County, California
Valencia Basket players
21st-century African-American sportspeople